Vama is a commune located in Suceava County, Bukovina, northeastern Romania. It is composed of four villages: namely Molid, Prisaca Dornei, Strâmtura, and Vama. The locality was a town until 1950 when it lost its urban status.

Administration and local politics

Communal council 

The commune's current local council has the following political composition, according to the results of the 2020 Romanian local elections:

Gallery

Natives 

 Liviu Giosan

References 

Communes in Suceava County
Localities in Southern Bukovina
Duchy of Bukovina